Abu Simbel (also Abu Simbal, Ebsambul or Isambul;  or ) is a village in the Egyptian part of Nubia, about  southwest of Aswan and near the border with Sudan. As of 2012, it has about 2600 inhabitants. It is best known as the site of the Abu Simbel temples, which were built by King Ramses II.

Name 
The name Abu Simbel, or Abu Sunbul in Modern Standard Arabic, is itself a derivative of the ancient place name Ipsambul. In the New Kingdom period, the region in which the temple was built may have been called Meha, but this is not certain.

Location and climate 
Abu Simbel is in Southern Egypt, not far from the Egypt–Sudan border. It is administratively part of the Aswan Governorate. However, the course of the border is disputed; Egypt claims the territory of the Wadi Halfa Salient up to the 22nd parallel in the south. The city was, like the Temple of Abu Simbel, relocated onto higher ground due to the flooding caused by the filling of the reservoir.

Abu Simbel is linked to the governorate capital of Aswan by a road that passes west of Lake Nasser, through the Libyan Desert. It is used predominantly by tour buses bringing visitors to the Abu Simbel temples, but it also has importance for the irrigation projects in the parts of the desert situated near the reservoir. Lake Nasser is navigable, so Abu Simbel is also reachable from the lakeside. A few cruise ships navigate the lake upstream of the Aswan Dam. The village is reachable by air via the Abu Simbel Airport.

Abu Simbel is located in one of the warmest and driest regions of Egypt. In the summer months, the high temperatures are easily  on average. Despite the great temperature differences between day and night, temperatures in summer seldom fall below . Precipitation is so rare here that it is impossible to state a "rainy season" for Abu Simbel.

History 
In the past, Abu Simbel was located on the west bank of the Nile between the first and second Cataracts of the Nile. Cataracts are rapids caused by boulders or rock sills; they were only passable with difficulty by Nile ship traffic, especially at baseflow. Today both cataracts near Aswan and Wadi Halfa are covered by Lake Nasser, which is named after Gamal Abdel Nasser, Egyptian president from 1954 to 1970. At the time of Ramses II, the southern border of the realm of the Pharaohs was located near the two cataracts. The construction of the Abu Simbel temple compound there was meant to demonstrate the power and eternal supremacy of Egypt with respect to the tributary Nubia.

The new dam flooded all of Lower Nubia, the inhabitants became homeless and were mostly resettled in the areas of Aswan and Kom Ombo. Only in Abu Simbel was a new village developed with a hotel and airport. Due to a lack of agricultural land the entire population now depends on tourism. Since the turn of the millennium, various projects are underway with the goal of making the elevated desert regions fertile using water from the lake.

The Great Temple at Abu Simbel, which took about twenty years to build, was completed around year 24 of the reign of Ramesses the Great (which corresponds to 1265 BC). It was dedicated to the gods Amun, Ra-Horakhty, and Ptah, as well as to the deified Ramesses himself. It is generally considered the grandest and most beautiful of the temples commissioned during the reign of Ramesses II, and one of the most beautiful in Egypt. The single entrance is flanked by four colossal, 20 m (66 ft) statues, each representing Ramesses II seated on a throne and wearing the double crown of Upper and Lower Egypt. The statue to the immediate left of the entrance was damaged in an earthquake, causing the head and torso to fall away; these fallen pieces were not restored to the statue during the relocation but placed at the statue's feet in the positions originally found. Next to Ramesses's legs are a number of other, smaller statues, none higher than the knees of the pharaoh, depicting: his chief wife, Nefertari Meritmut; his queen mother Mut-Tuy; his first two sons, Amun-her-khepeshef and Ramesses B; and his first six daughters: Bintanath, Baketmut, Nefertari, Meritamen, Nebettawy and Isetnofret.

Transportation 
Abu Simbel Airport

See also
 List of ancient Egyptian towns and cities
Aboccis

References

Villages in Egypt
Nubia
Abu Simbel